Aleksandr Vasilyevich Feklistov  (born December 7, 1955) is a Russian actor. He appeared in more than sixty films since 1984 (the film Troop).

Biography 
Aleksandr Feklistov was born on December 7, 1955 in Leningrad. In 1982, he graduated from Moscow Art Theatre School (course Oleg Yefremov).

Since 1982, Feklistov has been a Moscow Art Theatre actor, and moved into the studio in 1988. Man, was one of the organizers of the Fifth Moscow Art Theatre. In 1995 he returned to the Art Theater, where he performed in the play Love in the Crimea. In 2001, Feklistov left the troupe.

Personal life 
Aleksandr Vasilyevich is married and has three children.

Political position 
Aleksandr Feklistov denounced the policies of President Vladimir Putin with regard to Ukraine, Putin's actions in Ukraine and Crimea in 2014 and believes that this has a negative impact on Russia's image in the world.

Selected filmography

References

External links
 
 Official site
 А. В. Феклистов на сайте «Энциклопедия отечественного кино»

1955 births
Living people
Male actors from Saint Petersburg
Soviet male actors
Russian male film actors
Moscow Art Theatre School alumni
Russian activists against the 2022 Russian invasion of Ukraine